Desmidophorus cumingi is a species of weevil in the family Brachyceridae. This beetle can reach a length of about 12 mm. It occurs in the Philippines.

References

 Encyclopaedia of Life
 Zipcodezoo
 Arctos.database.museum
 Global Names Index
 Wtaxa

Brachyceridae
Beetles described in 1845
Insects of the Philippines